Gagan Malik (born 29 December 1976) is an Indian former cricketer. He played one List A match for Delhi in 1999/00.

See also
 List of Delhi cricketers

References

External links
 

1976 births
Living people
Indian cricketers
Delhi cricketers
Cricketers from Delhi